Hubble bubble may refer to:
Hookah, a water-cooled apparatus for smoking
Hubble bubble (astronomy), a local anomaly in the Hubble constant
a variant of the bubble and squeak in English cuisine
 Hubble Bubble, a Belgian punk band

See also 
 Hubble sphere